The Entomological Society of America (ESA) was founded in 1889 and today has more than 7,000 members, including educators, extension personnel, consultants, students, researchers, and scientists from agricultural departments, health agencies, private industries, colleges and universities, and state and federal governments. It serves the professional and scientific needs of entomologists and people in related disciplines. To facilitate communication among members, the ESA is divided into four sections based on entomological interests, and six branches, based on geographic proximity. The national office is located in Annapolis, Maryland.

History 
In 1889, the American Association of Economic Entomologists was founded by Charles V. Riley, primarily focusing on economic entomology. In 1906, the Entomological Society of America was organized to address the needs of the broader dimensions of biology, taxonomy, morphology, and faunistic studies of insects.

Governance 
Presidents serve for one year with the assistance of the Governing Board.

Executive Secretaries/Executive Directors serve for longer and have included:
19531955  Ashley B. Gurney
19551968  Robert Nelson, also President for 1971
1968?  Wallace P. Murdoch

Publications 
ESA publishes nine journals in partnership with Oxford University Press.

Annals of the Entomological Society of America
Environmental Entomology
Journal of Economic Entomology
Journal of Medical Entomology
American Entomologist
Arthropod Management Tests
Journal of Insect Science
Insect Systematics and Diversity
Journal of Integrated Pest Management

Branches 
The six ESA branches include five North American branches: Eastern, North Central, Pacific, Southeastern, and Southwestern. Their members are states/provinces of the US, Canada, and Mexico, with Puerto Rico and the U.S. Virgin Islands in the Southeastern Branch and the US territories of the Pacific Ocean in the Pacific Branch. All other nations and territories comprise the sixth, International Branch.

References

External links 
The Entomological Society of America
Guide to the Entomological Society of America, Southeastern Branch, Records 1937-2010

Entomological Society of America